Snowdon is the highest mountain in Wales, and the highest mountain in the UK outside of Scotland.

Snowdon may also refer to:

Places
 Snowdon (Devon), a hill in Dartmoor, England.
 Snowdon Massif, a mountain group in Snowdonia, Wales
 Snowdon, Montreal, a neighbourhood in Montreal, Canada  
 Snowdon (Montreal Metro), a metro station in Montreal, Canada
 Snowdon East, a town in Burma; see List of Victoria Cross recipients of the Indian Army

Other uses
 Antony Armstrong-Jones, 1st Earl of Snowdon or Lord Snowdon (1930-2017), British photographer
 Princess Margaret, Countess of Snowdon (1930–2002), British princess
 David Armstrong-Jones, 2nd Earl of Snowdon, (b.1961), British furniture maker
 Baron Snowdon, a former subsidiary title held by the Duke of Edinburgh (1726 creation)
 Earl of Snowdon, a title in the Peerage of the United Kingdom
 Lord Snowdon (disambiguation)
 Snowdon lily (Gagea serotina), a plant

See also
 Snowdonia, a region and national park in Wales
 Snowdon Mountain Railway, a railway that goes to the summit of the mountain
 Portmadoc, Beddgelert and South Snowdon Railway, a narrow gauge railway
 Christopher Snowdon, a UK based author
 Lisa Snowdon (born 1972), model
 Warren Snowdon (born 1950), Australian politician
 Will Snowdon (born 1983), English footballer
 Snowden (disambiguation)
 Edward Snowden (born 1983), former government contractor who leaked classified information from the US National Security Agency